Hade and Hading may refer to:
In geology, the angle of inclination from the vertical of a vein (geology), fault, or lode: it can be a noun or a verb
Jane Hading, a French actress
Hading is a form of Hadingus, a legendary early Danish king
Hade is a village in Hedesunda municipality in Sweden

See also
Hades